Cacozophera is a monotypic snout moth genus described by Harrison Gray Dyar Jr. in 1919. It contains the species Cacozophera venosa described by the same author. It is found in Guatemala.

The wingspan is about 19 mm. The forewings are brownish fuscous and the hindwings are smoky fuscous, although the veins and terminal margin are darker.

References

Phycitinae
Monotypic moth genera
Moths of Central America